Richard A. Bennett (born May 24, 1963) is an American politician from the state of Maine. Bennett is the President and CEO of ValueEdge Advisors, a firm he founded in summer 2014 to help institutional investors engage with their portfolio companies. From 2006 to 2014 he served as CEO of The Corporate Library and then Chairman or Vice Chairman of GMI Ratings, its successor company, an independent research firm focusing on corporate governance, director/executive compensation, and forensic accounting. For six years, Bennett was included in the NACD Directorship's "100 most influential people" in the boardroom and corporate governance community.

Biography 
As a resident of Norway, Maine, Bennett served as the President of the Maine Senate as the result of a unique power-sharing agreement between Republicans and Democrats predicated on an even split in state senators. The deal gave the presidency to both parties for one year each during each two-year senate term.

Bennett served four terms in the Maine Senate, two terms in the Maine House of Representatives, and in 1994 was the Republican nominee for Congress in Maine's second district, losing to John Baldacci in a close race. On May 2, 2008, he was elected to a four-year term as Maine's Republican National Committeeman.

In 2006, he considered running for Governor of Maine but decided to remain in the private sector instead. His name was widely circulated as a possible candidate for the Republican nomination for governor in 2010, but he ultimately decided against running. In November 2012, Bennett sought the Republican nomination for the U.S. Senate Seat vacated by Olympia Snowe but was defeated by Maine Secretary of State Charles E. Summers, Jr.

On July 20, 2013, Bennett was elected chairman of the Maine Republican Party, replacing former State Representative Richard Cebra of Naples. In 2015, Bennett was unanimously re-elected as Chairman of the Maine Republican Party. He was a Republican elector for Donald Trump in the 2016 presidential election for Maine's second congressional district.

References

1963 births
Living people
Harvard University alumni
University of Southern Maine alumni
Presidents of the Maine Senate
Members of the Maine House of Representatives
People from Oxford, Maine
Politicians from Portland, Maine
Maine Republican Party chairs
Businesspeople from Portland, Maine
American chief executives of financial services companies
2016 United States presidential electors
21st-century American politicians